Nuevitas is a municipality and port town in the Camagüey Province of Cuba. The large bay was sighted by Christopher Columbus in 1492.

History
Founded in 1775, the city was moved to its present site in 1828. Before the 1977 national municipal reform, Nuevitas was divided into the barrios of Primero, Segundo, Tercero, Alvaro Reinoso, Lugareño, Redención, San Miguel and Senado.

Geography
Nuevitas is located on the Guincho peninsula on the north coast, and borders with the municipalities of Guáimaro, Minas, Manatí (in Las Tunas Province) and Morón (in Ciego de Ávila Province). The municipality includes the villages of Camalote, Pastelillo, Playa Santa Lucía, San Agustín, San Miguel de Bagá and Santa Rita.

Nuevitas is not a very large city but it is one of Cuba's most important towns because of its commercial and industrial activities. Nuevitas is located southwest of Playa Santa Lucía, which is popular with tourists. Cayo Sabinal is located immediately north; other cays are Cayo Guajaba and Cayo Romano. The only waterway that separates Santa Lucia from Ensenada Playa Bonita is the canal of Nuevitas which connects the Bahia de Nuevitas to the Atlantic Ocean.

Demographics
In 2004, the municipality of Nuevitas had a population of 44,882.

Transport

Nuevitas is sheltered by a huge harbor, has two auxiliary ports, and is a major shipping point for Cuban sugar as well as other products from the surrounding agricultural region. It also possesses diversified light industry and serves as a road and rail terminus. The principal road crossing the municipality is the state highway "Circuito Norte" (CN).

The railway station is the terminus of two lines: one from Camagüey, and a second from Santa Clara, through the Atlantic Coast and Morón.

Personalities
Emilia Bernal (1882–1964), poet
Enrique Cirules (1938–2016), writer
Armando Coroneaux (b. 1985), footballer

Sister towns
 Benalmádena (Andalusia, Spain)
 Milwaukee (Wisconsin, USA). This twinnage makes Nuevitas the first sister city in Cuba to be linked with a city in the United States.

See also
Nuevitas Municipal Museum
List of cities in Cuba
Municipalities of Cuba

References

External links

 
Cities in Cuba
Populated places in Camagüey Province
Port cities and towns in Cuba
Populated places established in 1775
1775 establishments in the Spanish West Indies
1770s in Cuba